The Ministry of Information is the government ministry in charge of media and information in Cambodia. The current Minister of Information is Khieu Kanharith.

Organization 
The Ministry consists of:

 General Department of Administration and Finance
 General Department of Information and Broadcasting
 Kampuchea News Agency
 National Television of Kampuchea 
 National Radio of Kampuchea

References

External links 
 

Government ministries of Cambodia
Cambodia
Phnom Penh
Ministries established in 1993
1993 establishments in Cambodia